TCO may refer to:

Organisations
Tallinn Chamber Orchestra, an Estonian orchestra
Swedish Confederation of Professional Employees (Tjänstemännens Centralorganisation), a Swedish confederation of trade unions
Tengizchevroil
Topcoder Open, an event by Topcoder
The Cinematic Orchestra, a British-based jazz and electronic music group

Science and technology
Tail call optimization, a computer programming concept
TCO watchdog, a hardware watchdog timer nearly all desktop and server computers have
Transparent conducting oxide, a type of transparent conducting film in electronics
Thermal cutoff, a type of electronic protection component
Temporarily captured orbiter, a temporary natural satellite
TCO Certified, a specification for safety and sustainability of electronical products

Other
 TCO, the IATA code for La Florida Airport (Colombia)
 Total cost of ownership, a method of cost analysis
 Temporary certificate of occupancy
 Tactical Control Officer, see MIM-104 Patriot
 Native Community Lands (Tierras Comunitarias de Origen), Bolivian collectively titled indigenous territories
 Transnational Criminal Organization, see Transnational crime
 Taipei Chinese Orchestra, an orchestra in Taiwan

See also
 TOC (disambiguation)